Robert Stannard may refer to:
 Robert Stannard (bishop) (1895–1986), Anglican clergyman
 Robert Stannard (priest), Anglican priest in Ireland
 Robert Stannard (Royal Navy officer)
 Robert Stannard (cyclist) (born 1998), Australian cyclist